Ryan Liam Delaney (born 6 September 1996) is an Irish footballer who plays as a defender for EFL League One club Morecambe. He can play as a centre-back or as a left-back.

Club career

Wexford
Delaney joined Wexford's first team in the preseason of the 2014 season, making his debut on 21 March 2014 against Longford Town. He went on to make 12 league appearances that season. In 2015, Delaney made 16 league appearances and scored one goal against Shelbourne in a 4–1 win, as Wexford won the division. He made 16 league appearances, scoring one goal, in the first half of the 2016 Premier Division.

Burton Albion
Delaney moved to Championship club Burton Albion towards the end of July 2016.

Cork City
On 26 January 2017, Delaney moved on loan to League of Ireland Premier Division club Cork City on an initial six-month deal. He scored his first goal for City in a 4–0 win over Galway United at Turners Cross. After some strong performances, including a brace in a 4–1 home win over Shamrock Rovers, he won the Player of the Month award for May. Delaney extended his loan at City until the end of the season in late June. He continued to play in heart of the City defence as City won the league and FAI Cup. Delaney started in the final, as City beat Dundalk to claim the double for the first time in their history.

Rochdale
Delaney joined Rochdale on a permanent deal on 9 January 2018, signing a contract for two and half years. He made his first team debut against Millwall in the fourth round of the 2017–18 FA Cup on 28 January.

On 4 July 2018, Delaney signed a contract extension keeping him at the club until 2021.

In September 2019 Delaney joined AFC Wimbledon on loan. He scored his first goal for the club in a 4–1 win at Southend United.

Bolton Wanderers
On 31 January 2020, Delaney signed for Bolton Wanderers on an 18 month contract. He scored his first goal for the club in a 2–2 draw with Burton Albion. At the end of the 2020–21 season, Bolton offered Delany a new contract. However, they were unable to come to an agreement and Delaney was released at the end of his contract.

Morecambe
On 22 June 2021, it was announced he would sign for Morecambe on a two year contract once his Bolton contract expired joining former Bolton team mate Arthur Gnahoua who had also signed for Morecambe five days earlier. Delaney made his debut for the club on 7 August in a 2–2 draw with Ipswich Town. On 31 January 2022, Delaney joined EFL League Two side Scunthorpe United on loan for the remainder of the 2021–22 season reuniting with Manager Keith Hill for the third time in his career having played for him at Rochdale and Bolton.

International career
Delaney made his debut for the Republic of Ireland U21 side in a 3-1 win against Azerbaijan in a qualifying match for the U21 European Championship, coming on for Danny Kane in the 90th minute.

Career statistics

Club

Notes

Honours

Club
Wexford
League of Ireland First Division (1): 2015

Cork City
League of Ireland Premier Division (1): 2017
FAI Cup (1): 2017
Munster Senior Cup (1): 2017
FAI President's Cup (1): 2017

Bolton Wanderers
EFL League Two third-place (promotion): 2020–21

Individual
League of Ireland Premier Division Player of the Month (1): May 2017
PFAI Team of the Year (1): 2017

References

Association footballers from County Wexford
Republic of Ireland association footballers
1996 births
Living people
Wexford F.C. players
Burton Albion F.C. players
Cork City F.C. players
Rochdale A.F.C. players
Bolton Wanderers F.C. players
Morecambe F.C. players
Scunthorpe United F.C. players
English Football League players
Republic of Ireland under-21 international footballers
League of Ireland players
Association football defenders